This is the list of Belgian ministers of the Interior.

List of ministers

1831 to 1899

1900 to 1999

2000–

Lists of government ministers of Belgium
1831 establishments in Belgium